Keith Ciancia, better known as Keefus Green or Keefus Ciancia is an American musician, composer and music producer. He has won an Ivor Novello Award and been nominated for an Emmy. Along with his long time creative collaborator, T Bone Burnett, he has co-composed and produced several film and television soundtracks, including the HBO series True Detective and the Coen brothers' The Ladykillers. He has produced records for a variety of artists including Kimbra, Everlast, A Fine Frenzy, Étienne Daho, Nikka Costa and Cassandra Wilson. As a keyboardist and pianist he has performed with Mike Patton, Marc Ribot, Iggy Pop, Father John Misty, Elton John and T Bone Burnett. He also co-produced and co-wrote Sleeping Tapes with Jeff Bridges.

Ciancia was the keyboardist for Everlast, with whom he wrote and produced the Emmy nominated theme song for the TNT series Saving Grace. In 1993 he met his wife, singer Jade Vincent, and together they formed the ten piece experimental big band, The Jade Vincent Experience which later became Vincent & Mister Green. They were signed to Mike Patton's label, Ipecac Recordings and have composed and recorded music for a variety of films and television series and specials including Divine Secrets of the Ya-Ya Sisterhood, Killing Eve, and Baby Driver.
 
Ciancia has one daughter, writer Raven Violet Ciancia-Vincent, and lives in France where he and Jade continue to write, record and perform music together.

Career
Ciancia began a working relationship with T-Bone Burnett as a session musician after being heard on a local radio station in Los Angeles. Keefus later co-produced on a few T-Bone projects such as the Coen Brothers' film The Ladykillers and Cassandra Wilson's album Thunderbird. He is currently the co-composer with Burnett for the HBO series True Detective. The duo released the album The Invisible Light: Acoustic Space in 2019 with Jay Bellerose.

Keefus has recently scored the soundtrack for Strangerland and co-produced and co-wrote Jeff Bridges's latest release, Sleeping Tapes.

Composing credits

Awards
Emmy nomination for co-writing and producing the theme song for the hit television series Saving Grace (2010)
 BMI award for music scoring (2010)
 Won an Ivor Novello Award for Best TV Soundtrack for the series London Spy (2016)

References

Living people
American rock musicians
1972 births
Place of birth missing (living people)
American male songwriters